The 2014–15 Cypriot Cup was the 73rd edition of the Cypriot Cup. A total of 26 clubs entered the competition. It began on 29 October 2014 with the first round and concluded on 20 May 2015 with the final which was held at GSZ Stadium. APOEL clinched their 21st Cypriot Cup trophy and their second in successive seasons with a convincing 4–2 victory over AEL Limassol.

Format
In the 2014–15 Cypriot Cup, participated all the teams of the Cypriot First Division and the Cypriot Second Division (Divisions B1 and B2). Teams from the two lower divisions (Third and Fourth) competed in a separate cup competition.

The competition consisted of five rounds. In the first round each tie was played as a single leg and was held at the home ground of the one of the two teams, according to the draw results. Each tie winner was qualifying to the next round. If a match was drawn, extra time was following. If extra time was drawn, there was a replay at the ground of the team who were away for the first game. If the rematch was also drawn, then extra time was following and if the match remained drawn after extra time the winner was decided by penalty shoot-out.

The next three rounds were played in a two-legged format, each team playing a home and an away match against their opponent. The team which scored more goals on aggregate, was qualifying to the next round. If the two teams scored the same number of goals on aggregate, then the team which scored more goals away from home was advancing to the next round. 
 
If both teams had scored the same number of home and away goals, then extra time was following after the end of the second leg match. If during the extra thirty minutes both teams had managed to score, but they had scored the same number of goals, then the team who scored the away goals was advancing to the next round (i.e. the team which was playing away). If there weren't scored any goals during extra time, the qualifying team was determined by penalty shoot-out.

The final was a single match.

The cup winner secured a place in the 2015–16 UEFA Europa League.

First round
The first round draw took place on 16 October 2014 and the matches played on 29 October and 5 November 2014.

Second round
The second round draw took place on 11 December 2014 and the matches played on 7, 14, 28 January 2015 and on 4 February 2015.

The following six teams advanced directly to second round, meeting the ten winners of first round ties:
APOEL (2013–14 Cypriot Cup winner)
Ermis Aradippou (2013–14 Cypriot Cup finalist)
AEL Limassol (2013–14 Cypriot First Division runners-up)
Apollon Limassol (2013–14 Cypriot First Division 3rd placed team)
Omonia (2013–14 Cypriot First Division 5th placed team)
AEK Larnaca (2013–14 Cypriot First Division Fair Play winner)

|}

Quarter-finals
The quarter-finals draw took place on 27 January 2015 and the matches played on 11 and 18 February 2015 and on 4 and 11 March 2015.

|}

Semi-finals
The semi-finals draw took place on 24 March 2015 and the matches played on 8 and 22 April 2015.

|}

First leg

Second leg

Final

See also
 Cypriot Cup
 2014–15 Cypriot First Division
 2014–15 Cypriot Second Division

References

Sources
 

Cypriot Cup seasons
2014–15 European domestic association football cups
2014–15 in Cypriot football